Alsophila hornei is a species of tree fern in the Cyatheaceae family.

Its natural distribution covers eastern New Guinea and the Louisiade Archipelago to Fiji, where it grows in wet submontane forest, stunted forest, mossy forest, and on ridges, at an altitude of 400–2000 m. The trunk of this plant is erect, 3–4 m tall and up to about 4 cm in diameter. Fronds may be pinnate or bipinnate and reach a length of 2 m. Basal scales cover the dark rachis and stipe of this species. These scales are glossy and either bicoloured (dark with a paler margin) or light brown and bullate. Sori almost cover the lower segments of fertile pinnules. Indusia are absent.

Large and Braggins (2004) note that A. hornei is a variable species across its range. Individual populations may differ in terms of minor details of the division of the pinnae and smaller basal pinnae may be either present or absent altogether.

The specific epithet hornei commemorates botanist John Horne (1835-1905), who collected numerous plants on Fiji and islands of the Indian Ocean.

It is listed in the International Union for Conservation of Nature of threatened species under the synonymous name Gymnosphaera hornei.

References

External links
Ash, J. 1987. Demography of Cyathea hornei (Cyatheaceae), a Tropical Tree-Fern in Fiji. Australian Journal of Botany 35(3): 331-342.

hornei
Flora of New Guinea
Flora of Fiji
Taxa named by John Gilbert Baker
Taxobox binomials not recognized by IUCN